Szabolcs Varga (born 17 March 1995) is a Hungarian football player who plays for Bicske.

Career

Early career 
While playing for Vasas U19s, in 2012, Varga was named "Player of the Tournament" in the CEE Cup.

MTK Budapest
He started his adult career in MTK Budapest FC. He debuted in the Nemzeti Bajnokság I in the 2012–13 season.

Heerenveen
On 3 January 2014, Varga was signed by Eredivisie club Heerenveen S.C.

Békéscsaba
On 13 June 2021, Varga signed with Békéscsaba.

International career
He was also part of the Hungarian U-19 at the 2014 UEFA European Under-19 Championship.

Club statistics

Updated to games played as of 1 December 2013.

References

External links
Profile at HLSZ 
Profile at MLSZ 
Voetbal International profile 

1995 births
Living people
Sportspeople from Székesfehérvár
Hungarian footballers
Hungary youth international footballers
Hungary under-21 international footballers
Hungarian expatriate footballers
Association football midfielders
MTK Budapest FC players
SC Heerenveen players
Soproni VSE players
Vác FC players
Szeged-Csanád Grosics Akadémia footballers
Békéscsaba 1912 Előre footballers
Dunaújváros PASE players
Nemzeti Bajnokság I players
Nemzeti Bajnokság II players
Nemzeti Bajnokság III players
Eredivisie players
Expatriate footballers in the Netherlands
Hungarian expatriate sportspeople in the Netherlands